Phulpur Lok Sabha seat, also spelled 'Phoolpur', is one of the 80 Lok Sabha (parliamentary)  constituencies in Uttar Pradesh state in northern India. It lies in Prayagraj district. Phulpur is a historic constituency and two  Indian Prime Ministers  Jawaharlal Nehru and V P Singh have been elected  from this constituency. The first Prime Minister of India of  Jawaharlal Nehru died in office in 1964 while holding this seat. Hence it (फूलपुर) is also called "Nehru's constituency".

Vidhan Sabha Segments

Members of Lok Sabha

^ by poll

Election Results

General Election 2019

Bye-election 2018

General Election 2014

General Election 2009

General Election 1962

Bye-poll 1964
 Vijaya Lakshmi Pandit (Congress) : 110549 votes
 S.JAISWAL (SSP) : 52,529

General elections 1957
 Two members were elected from this seat in 1957.

General Election 1952

See also
 Allahabad district
 Allahabad (Mayoral Constituency)
 List of Constituencies of the Lok Sabha

Notes

References

External links
Phulpur lok sabha  constituency election 2019 result details

Lok Sabha constituencies in Uttar Pradesh
Politics of Allahabad district